Potato moth may refer to:

Stoeberhinus testaceus, potato moth, from the Pacific Islands
Phthorimaea operculella, potato tuber moth, found worldwide 
Symmetrischema tangolias, Andean/South American potato tuber moth, from South America and introduced in North America, Australia and New Zealand
Tecia solanivora, Guatemalan potato moth, found in South and Central America and introduced in the Canaries and Spain
Agrotis bilitura, potato cutworm, found in South America

See also
List of Lepidoptera that feed on Solanum, which includes potatoes

Animal common name disambiguation pages